Dominica first competed at the Olympic Games in 1996, and has participated in each Games since then.  Dominica has yet to win any medals at the Olympic Games.

The Dominica Olympic Committee was formed in 1993 and recognized in 1998, 20 years after its independence.

Dominica made its Winter Olympics debut in 2014.

Medal tables

Medals by Summer Games

Medals by Winter Games

See also
 List of flag bearers for Dominica at the Olympics
 Dominica at the Commonwealth Games
 Tropical nations at the Winter Olympics

References

External links